Pseudopolygrammodes is a genus of moths of the family Crambidae. It contains only one species, Pseudopolygrammodes priscalis, which is found in China (Yunnan).

References

Natural History Museum Lepidoptera genus database

Pyraustinae
Crambidae genera
Taxa named by Eugene G. Munroe